The Little Mermaid is a bronze statue by Edvard Eriksen, depicting a mermaid becoming human. The sculpture is displayed on a rock by the waterside at the Langelinie promenade in Copenhagen, Denmark.

Based on the 1837 fairy tale of the same name by Danish author Hans Christian Andersen, the small and unimposing statue is a Copenhagen icon and has been a major tourist attraction since its unveiling in 1913. In recent decades it has become a popular target for defacement by vandals and political activists.

Mermaid is among iconic statues that symbolize cities; others include: the statue of Pania of the Reef in Napier, Manneken Pis in Brussels, the Statue of Liberty in New York and Christ the Redeemer in Rio de Janeiro.

History

The statue was commissioned in 1909 by Carl Jacobsen, son of the founder of Carlsberg, who had been fascinated by a ballet about the fairytale in Copenhagen's Royal Theatre and asked the ballerina, Ellen Price, to model for the statue. The sculptor Edvard Eriksen created the bronze statue, which was unveiled on August 23, 1913. The statue's head was modelled after Price, but as the ballerina did not agree to model in the nude, the sculptor's wife, Eline Eriksen, was used for the body.

The Copenhagen City Council arranged to move the statue to Shanghai at the Danish Pavilion for the duration of the Expo 2010 (May to October), the first time it had been moved officially from its perch since it was installed almost a century earlier. While the statue was away in Shanghai an authorised copy was displayed on a rock in the lake in Copenhagen's nearby Tivoli Gardens.
Copenhagen officials have considered moving the statue several meters out into the harbour to discourage vandalism and to prevent tourists from climbing onto it, but as of September 2022 the statue remains on dry land at the water side at Langelinie.

Vandalism

The statue has been damaged and defaced many times since the mid-1960s for various reasons, but has been restored each time.

On April 24, 1964, the statue's head was sawn off and stolen by politically oriented artists of the Situationist movement, amongst them Jørgen Nash. The head was never recovered and a new head was produced and placed on the statue. On July 22, 1984, the right arm was sawn off and returned two days later by two young men.

On January 6, 1998, the statue was decapitated again; the culprits were never found, but the head was returned anonymously to a nearby television station, and reattached on February 4. On the night of September 10, 2003, the statue was knocked off its base with explosives and later found in the harbour's waters. Holes had been blasted in the mermaid's wrist and knee.

Paint has been poured on the statue several times, including one episode in 1963 and two in March and May 2007. On March 8, 2006, a dildo was attached to the statue's hand, green paint was dumped over it, and the date March 8 were written on it. It is suspected that this vandalism was connected with International Women's Day, which is on March 8. The statue was found drenched in red paint on May 30, 2017 with the message "Danmark defend the whales of the Faroe Islands", a reference to whaling in the Faroe Islands (an autonomous country in the Kingdom of Denmark), written on the ground in front of the statue. About two weeks later, on June 14, the statue was drenched in blue and white paint. "Befri Abdulle" (Free Abdulle) was written in front of the statue, but it was unclear what this referred to at the time. Later, police said the writing was likely referring to Abdulle Ahmed, a Somalian refugee who has been detained in a high security unit in Denmark since 2001 due to a custody sentence. On 13 January 2020, "Free Hong Kong" was painted on the stone the statue is mounted on by supporters of the 2019–20 Hong Kong protests. On 3 June 2020, in the wake of the George Floyd protests and Black Lives Matter movement, the statue was vandalized with the words "racist fish" scrawled on its stone base, which left observers and specialists puzzled, as nothing related to the statue, H.C. Andersen or his fairy tale could be construed as racist. In March 2022, "Z = svastika" was written on the stone base of the statue, which was thought to be opposition to Russia and their invasion of Ukraine, where Russian forces widely used "Z" as their symbol. Almost exactly a year later, a Russian flag was painted on the stone, which was thought to be a show of support for Russia.

Although not regarded as vandalism since no damage is done to the statue, people have also repeatedly dressed it, either for fun or to make more serious statements. In 2004, the statue was draped in a burqa in a protest against Turkey's application to join the European Union. In May 2007, it was again found draped in Muslim dress and a head scarf. Other examples are times where a Christmas hat has been put on the head, or it has been dressed in the jerseys of the Norwegian or Swedish national football teams (especially the Danish and Swedish teams have a highly competitive rivalry).

Copies
Aside from the statue on display, which is a replica of the original,  more than thirteen undamaged copies of the statue are located around the world, listed by Mermaids of Earth, including Solvang, California; Kimballton, Iowa; Piatra Neamţ, Romania; Torrejón de Ardoz (Madrid), Spain; Seoul, South Korea; and a half-sized copy in Calgary, Alberta, Canada.  The grave of Danish-American entertainer Victor Borge includes a copy as well. The Copenhagen Airport also has a replica of the mermaid along with a statue of Andersen.

Some statues similar to The Little Mermaid are in Sicily. The first it placed in 1962 on the seafront in Giardini Naxos, and measures about four meters high over a fountain.
A second always portraying a mermaid Post on a depth of sea about 18 meters. Inside the Marine Protected Area of Plemmiro of Siracusa.

A statue of 'The Little Mermaid' looks out over Larvotto beach in Monaco.  She was created, in 2000, with layers and layers of metal by Kristian Dahlgard, in homage to the Danes who live in Monaco and for the late Prince Rainier III to mark the 50th year of his reign.

A copy of the statue forms the Danish contribution to the International Peace Gardens in Salt Lake City.  The half-size replica was stolen on February 26, 2010, but was recovered on April 7 abandoned in the park.

A replica of the statue was presented by Denmark to Brazil in 1960, in honor of the construction of Brasília, the country's new capital that was inaugurated in the year. It was installed just 5 years later in front of the main building of the Brazilian Navy Command, in Brasília, Federal District, where it remains today.

Copyright issues

The statue is under copyright until 2029, seventy years after the 1959 death of the creator. , replicas can be purchased, authorized for sale by the Eriksen family. The Danish newspaper Berlingske was sued in 2020 for publishing cartoons that parodied the statue as part of an article about Danish debate culture and right-wing ideas. The newspaper was accused of demonizing The Little Mermaid and the court ordered it to pay 285,000 kroner. The newspaper lost its appeal in February 2022.

A replica was installed in Greenville, Michigan in 1994 to celebrate the town's Danish heritage, at a cost of $10,000. In 2009 the Artists Rights Society asked the town for a $3,800 licensing fee, claiming the work violated Eriksen's copyright. The copyright claim was later reported to have been dropped.

There are similarities between The Little Mermaid statue and the Pania of the Reef statue on the beachfront at Napier in New Zealand, and some similarities in the little mermaid and Pania tales. The 1972 statue of a female diver (titled Girl in a Wetsuit by Elek Imredy) in Vancouver, British Columbia, Canada was commissioned when, unable to obtain permission to reproduce the Copenhagen statue, Vancouver authorities selected a modern version.

In 2016, a similar statue was installed at the harbor in Asaa, Denmark, where it is also mounted on the top of a rock. The heirs of the sculptor are suing, claiming that the Asaa statue bears too close a resemblance to the famous one, and they are demanding damages and the destruction of the Asaa statue.

In popular culture
The sculpture is seen in the following films:
 Sun Over Denmark (1936)
 Wienerbarnet (1941)
 Bundfald (1957)
 Forelsket i København (1960)
 Reptilicus (1961)
 Løgn og løvebrøl (1961)
 Pigen og millionæren (1965)
 En ven i bolignøden (1965)
 Slap af, Frede (1966)
Hans Christian Andersen's The Little Mermaid (1975)
 Hopla på sengekanten (1976)
 Olsen-banden går i krig (1978)
 Walter og Carlo i Amerika (1989)
 Krummerne (1991)
 Copenhagen (2014)

See also
 Mermaid of Warsaw
 Mermaid of Zennor

Notes

References

External links

 
 Mermaid of North
 The Little Mermaid. Photo gallery from Denmark. Hans Christian Andersen Information
 The Little Mermaid – 360 degree QuickTime VR panorama from Copenhagen
 The Little Mermaid human statue recreated in Sydney, Australia

1913 establishments in Denmark
1913 sculptures
Works based on The Little Mermaid
Landmarks in Copenhagen
Nude sculptures in Denmark
Outdoor sculptures in Copenhagen
Port of Copenhagen
Sculptures of mermaids
Statues of women in Copenhagen
Statues in Copenhagen
Statues of fictional characters in Denmark
Tourist attractions in Copenhagen
Vandalized works of art
Sculptures based on literature